Mary Martin (1913–1990) was an American actress and singer.

Mary Martin may also refer to:
Mary Letitia Martin (1815–1850), Irish writer
Mary Martin (teacher) (1817–1884), New Zealand community leader, teacher and writer
Mary Ward (suffragist) (née Martin; 1851–1933), Irish suffragist
Mary Martin (missionary) (1892–1975), Irish missionary
Mary Martin (artist) (1907–1969), British sculptor
Mary Martin (netball) (1915–1988), New Zealand netball player
Mary Maydwell Martin (1915–1973), Australian bookseller
Mary Brandon Martin, founder of Lower Brandon Plantation
Mary Martin (silent film actress) (active 1910s), American actress
María Martín (actress) (born 1923), Spanish actress, occasionally credited as Maria Martin

See also
The Mary Martin Show, a 2000 song by The New Pornographers, from the album Mass Romantic
Mary Gabriel Martyn (1604–1672), abbess of the Poor Clares of Galway